Dart Line was a British ferry operator operating from the River Thames near Dartford.  

The company had several vessels named Dart:
, operated 1997–2002
, operated 1996–2005
, launched 1985, used on the Dartford–Vlissingen, Dartford–Zeebrugge and Dartford–Dunkirk routes 1997–2006
, operated 1997–2006
, operated 1996–1999
, launched 1998, used on the Dartford–Vlissingen line and Dartford–Dunkirk in 1998–1999 and 2003
, launched 1998, operated on the Dartford–Vlissingen line in 1999
, operated 1999–2006
, operated 1999–2006

They also operated other ships:
, launched 1991, operated Dartford–Vlissingen in 2003

Dart Line was owned by Jacobs Holdings, who in 2000 announced a move of the freight and ferry services at Thames Europort, Dartford, to Shell Haven in Essex.  In 2006 the parent company Bidvest sold Dart Line to Cobelfret.

See also
Dart (ship)

External links
Dart Line at the Ferry Site

References

Ferry companies of England